Puerto Nuevo is a lakeside village near the outflow of Ranco Lake in La Unión commune, southern Chile.

Geography of Los Ríos Region
Populated places in Ranco Province
Populated lakeshore places in Chile